Cartagena is a Spanish city and a major naval station on the Mediterranean coast, south-eastern Iberia. As of January 2018, it has a population of 218,943 inhabitants, being the region's second-largest municipality and the country's sixth-largest non-provincial-capital city. The metropolitan area of Cartagena, known as Campo de Cartagena, has a population of 409,586 inhabitants.

Cartagena has been inhabited for over two millennia, being founded around 227 BC by the Carthaginian Hasdrubal the Fair as Qart Hadasht (meaning "New Town"), the same name as the original city of Carthage. The city had its heyday during the Roman Empire, when it was known as Carthago Nova (the New Carthage) and Carthago Spartaria, capital of the province of Carthaginensis.

Much of the historical significance of Cartagena stemmed from its coveted defensive port, one of the most important in the western Mediterranean. Cartagena has been the capital of the Spanish Navy's Maritime Department of the Mediterranean since the arrival of the Spanish Bourbons in the 18th century. As far back as the 16th century it was one of the most important naval ports in Spain, together with Ferrol in the North. It is still an important naval seaport, the main military haven of Spain, and is home to a large naval shipyard.

The confluence of civilizations as well as its strategic harbour, together with the rise of the local mining industry is manifested by a unique artistic heritage, with a number of landmarks such as the Roman Theatre, the second largest of the Iberian Peninsula after the one in Mérida, an abundance of Phoenician, Roman, Byzantine and Moorish remains, and a plethora of Art Nouveau buildings, a result of the bourgeoisie from the early 20th century. Cartagena is now established as a major cruise ship destination in the Mediterranean and an emerging cultural focus.

It was the first of a number of cities that have been named Cartagena, most notably Cartagena, Colombia.

Geography and climate

Geography and relief
The city of Cartagena is located in the southeastern region of Spain in the Campo de Cartagena.
The Cartagena region can be viewed as a great plain inclined slightly in the direction NW-SE, bordered at the north and the northwest by pre-coastal mountain ranges (Carrascoy, El Puerto, Los Villares, Columbares and Escalona), and at the south and southwest by coastal mountain ranges (El Algarrobo, La Muela, Pelayo, Gorda, La Fausilla y Minera, with its last spurs in Cape Palos).

The dominant geology of the region is metamorphic (slate, marble) and sedimentary (limestone). The most widely present kind of soil is calcic xerosol. Other soils that occur in the municipality are the leptosol, which forms the Mediterranean coast, and the petrocalcic xerosol.

The city is located just at the end of the new AP-7 motorway. The following villages are part of Cartagena municipality: La Azohía, Isla Plana, Los Urrutias and Los Nietos.

The Old Town is limited by five small hills (Molinete, Monte Sacro, Monte de San José, Despeñaperros and Monte de la Concepción) following the example of Rome. In the past, there was an inner sea between the hills called the Estero that eventually dried up. On this site, the "Ensanche" (Expansion or New Town) was built at the beginning of the 20th century.

The urban area is delimited or crossed by several watercourses, some of which go deep into the urban network during a large part of their courses.

Climate
Cartagena has a hot semi-arid climate. Its location near the sea moderates the temperature, and annual precipitation typically does not surpass .
The wind is an important climatic factor in the region.

Human geography 

The municipality has 24 districts, known as diputaciones (councils). The origin of this administrative structure has its date in the beginning of the 18th century when population was increasing and the municipality was becoming less tractable. The districts are:

 Cartagena Casco: This is the district where the main town (also named Cartagena) is placed and is located in the south of the municipality. Its population consisted of 57,001 in 2019.
 San Antonio Abad: It is located in the south of the municipality and adjoins Cartagena Casco in its south and Canteras in its west. The number of inhabitants was 44,882 in 2019.
 El Plan: It adjoins La Magdalena in its west and Lentiscar in its east. There were 35,974 residents in 2019.
 Rincón de San Ginés: It is located in the southeast end of the municipality. Its population consisted of 10,214 people in the year 2019.
 Canteras: This coastal district is placed in the south of the territory and faces the Mediterranean Sea in its south. It is also adjoining to Perín in its west and San Antonio Abad in its east. There were 10,167 people living in the year 2019.
 El Algar: It is located in the east of Cartagena and adjoins Lentiscar in its north. The number of inhabitants consisted in 7,961.
 Santa Lucía: It is placed in the south of the municipality and faces the Mediterranean Sea in its south.
 La Palma: It is located in the north of the municipality. It shares borders with Lentiscar in its east.
 Pozo Estrecho: It is placed in the north of Cartagena and shares borders with La Palma in its east and with El Albujón in its west. There were 5,149 people who resided in the area in the year 2019.
 La Aljorra: This district occupies the northwestern end of the municipality. The number of inhabitants equalled to 4,962 people in the year 2019.
 La Magdalena: It occupies part of the west of the municipality and adjoins La Aljorra in its north. Its population consisted of 3,893 in the year 2019.
 Alumbres: It is located in the southeast quarter of Cartagena.
 Albujón: It is placed in the northwest of Cartagena and shares borders with La Aljorra in its west.
 San Félix: It is located in the approximate centre of Cartagena and is adjacent to Lentiscar in its northeast. The territory was inhabited by 2,694 people in the year 2019.
 Santa Ana: This district is placed in the northern half of Cartagena. It adjoins Pozo Estrecho in its north. Its population consisted of 2,501 people in the year 2019.
 El Beal: The territory is located in the east of the municipality and shares borders with Rincón de San Ginés in its south. There were 2,342 residents present in the year 2019.
 Lentiscar: This district is placed in the northeast end of Cartagena. There were 2,022 residents in the year 2019.
 Perín: It is located in the south of the municipality and adjoins the Mediterranean Sea in its south and Los Puertos in its west. Perín was home to 1,591 people in the year 2019.
 Los Puertos: It occupies the southwest end, but also part of inner west that is not end of the municipality and is adjoining Campo Nubla in its west. This was inhabited by 1,349 people in the year 2019.
 Miranda: This district is placed in the northwest quarter of Cartagena. It shares borders with Pozo Estrecho in its northeast and El albujón in its northwest.
 Hondón: It is located in the southeast quarter and is adjoining San Félix in its south. The district was inhabited by 1,117 people in the year 2019.
 Campo Nubla: This district occupies part of the west end of the municipality. The territory was home to 203 people in the year 2019.
 Los Médicos: It is placed in the northern half of the territory. The district shares borders with La Palma and Pozo Estrecho in its north.
 Escombreras: It is located in the south of Cartagena. There were 9 people living in the area in the year 2019.

Environment
Despite the intense mining, tourist and industrial exploitation that the area has suffered for centuries, the territory around Cartagena city hosts an extraordinary natural wealth and diversity, with a large number of botanical endemic species. Part of its area is subject to different levels of legal protection.

Flora

Cartagena's coastal mountains have one of the highest levels of botanical biodiversity on the Iberian Peninsula. A number of surprising Ibero-African species, which are only found in southern Spain (mostly in the provinces of Murcia and Almería) and North Africa. Among these, there stands out Tetraclinis articulata or Sandarac (sabina mora o ciprés de Cartagena—Cartagena's cypress in Spanish) native to Morocco, Algeria, Tunisia, Malta, and Cartagena, growing at relatively low altitudes in a hot, dry Mediterranean woodland.

Fauna

Among the animal species includes some threatened or endangered ones like the peregrine falcon, the Eurasian eagle-owl, the golden eagle and the Bonelli's eagle, the spur-thighed tortoise, the greater horseshoe bat and, especially, the Spanish toothcarp, a fish endemic to south-eastern Spain. In addition, the presence of the common chameleon (the only chameleon in Europe) has been documented for about 30 years, although it is not clear whether it is native or introduced. Some other species of note include the greater flamingo, the red fox, the European rabbit, the European badger, the beech marten, the common genet, the wildcat and the wild boar.

Protected areas

It belongs to four municipalities, including Cartagena. In 1994, it was included on the list of the Ramsar Convention (nº706) for the conservation and sustainable utilization of wetlands. It is also one of the Specially Protected Areas of Mediterranean Importance (SPAMI) by the United Nations. Its five volcanic islands (Perdiguera, Mayor or del Barón, del Ciervo, Redonda and del Sujeto) just like El Carmolí and San Ginés hills, the Hita and Amoladora beaches, the Lo Poyo salt marsh and the salt mines of Marchamalo are protected as well.
 Calblanque, Monte de las Cenizas and Peña del Águila, declared a Natural Park and Site of Community Importance (SCI). It is located in the south-east of the municipality.
 Sierra de la Muela, Cabo Tiñoso and Roldán mountain, Natural Park, Site of Community Importance and Special Protection Area (SPA). It occurs in the south-west of the municipality.
 Sierra de la Fausilla, Special Protection Area. It is placed in the south of Escombreras district and between Cartagena and Calblanque Regional Park.
 Islands and Islets of the Mediterranean coast, including Grossa Island (belonging to the municipality of San Javier, Hormigas Islands, Palomas Islands and Escombreras Islands, some of them also designed as Special Protection Area.

History

Prehistory 
There is mention of the presence of individuals belonging to the genus Homo in the cave Cueva Victoria 1,300,000 years ago. This cave is located in the southeastern quarter of Cartagena.

Remains of Neanderthal individuals of the Mousterian culture were found in the Cave of Los Aviones. This place is located close to Cartagena. There were also remains of Neanderthals belonging to the Mousterian culture in the cave Cueva Bermeja, which is placed in the southwestern quarter of the municipality.

At the southeast corner of the municipality remains of humans of the Upper Paleolithic were discovered. The paleontological sites are the Abrigo de Los Déntoles cove, the Cueva de Los Mejillones cave, and the Cabezo de San Ginés (hill). The West of the municipality was also the scene of human activity in that period. Concrete evidence of this are the Cueva del Caballo and Cueva Bermeja caves.

The southeast end of Cartagena was inhabited again during the Mesolithic. Important spots are the Cueva de Los Pájaros and Cueva de Los Mejillones (caves). Neolithic components such as ceramic remains were located.

The southeast of Cartagena was again inhabited during the Neolithic. The sites are Las Amoladeras and Calblanque. The south of the Alumbres district was also inhabited during that period. The archaeological site is located in the Cerro del Gorguel hill and in it a characteristic Neolithic hamlet was discovered.

The reasons for the dearth of human presence and structures in this municipality during the Neolithic period were the lack of rainfall and the absence of water beds. During the Bronze Age there was a similar situation.

The Argaric civilization inhabited the southeast of the Iberian Peninsula (Región de Murcia and Almería) during the Bronze Age. Nevertheless, they did not significantly occupy this municipality, there were few structures belonging to them and they had little relevance here. They lived in the northwest.

Ancient history

The town was originally named Mastia. Possessing one of the best harbors in the Western Mediterranean, it was re-founded by the Carthaginian general Hasdrubal in 228 BC as Qart Hadasht ("New City"), a name identical to Carthage, for the purpose of serving as a stepping-off point for the conquest of Spain. The Roman general Scipio Africanus conquered it in 209 BC and renamed it as Carthago Nova (literally "New New City") to distinguish it from the mother city. It became a tributary community (civitas stipendaria). Julius Caesar gave the town Latin Rights, and Octavian renamed it in his honor as the colony Colonia Victrix Iulia Nova Carthago or Colonia Vrbs Iulia Nova Carthago (C. V. I. N. C.) depending on the source. The city was very relevant both in the Carthaginian and the Roman conquest of the Iberian Peninsula. In 298 AD, Diocletian constituted a new Roman province in Hispania called Carthaginensis and settled the capital in this city. It remained important until it was sacked by the Vandals in 435 AD.

During the Roman period, it was the site of major silver mines, yielding a daily revenue of 25,000 drachmae. It was known also for the production of garum, a fermented fish sauce, and for esparto grass which granted it a new name, Cartago Spartaria.

Middle Ages

The demise and fall of Western Roman sovereignty caused Cartago Spartaria to go into decline. It was occupied successively by the Vandals (409–425), the Visigoths (425–551 and 624–714) and the Eastern Romans (551–624), who made it the capital of Spania (the Byzantine Empire's westernmost province). Cartagena was re-conquered by the Visigoths, who held it until the Muslim conquest in 714 AD. By that time it was barely a fishing village. It was called Qartayannat-al-Halfa. It was subsequently ruled by the Umayyads (714–756), the Caliphate of Cordova (756–1031), the Taifa of Denia (1031–1076), the Taifa of Saragossa (1076–1081), the Taifa of Tortosa (1081–1092), the Almoravids (1092–1145), the Almohads (1145–1229) and the Taifa of Murcia (1229–1245). Following the local refusal to abide to the 1243 Treaty of Alcazaz, a Castilian army led by the infante Alfonso of Castile took Cartagena by force in 1245 by means of a military operation combining land forces and a Cantabrian fleet. It was granted a fuero copied after Córdoba's in 1246. Similarly to the other subdued rebel towns, it early underwent an aggressive process of Castilianization. The Bishopric of Cartagena was created. In 1270, Alfonso created the Order of Santa María de España for the naval defense of the Crown of Castile and established its headquarters in Cartagena. In 1296, Cartagena was briefly annexed to the Crown of Aragon, but returned to Castile by the Treaty of Elx in 1305, which fixed the final boundary between the kingdoms of Valencia and Murcia. Cartagena then lost its status as royal demesne and became a seigneurial jurisdiction, a situation which lasted until 1346. Cartagena did not fully recover until the 18th century, when it became a leading naval port in the Mediterranean.

Modern history

On 3 September 1643, the Battle of Cartagena took place near the Cabo de Gata between a Spanish fleet and a French fleet.

In 1728, Cartagena became the capital of the Spanish Navy's Maritime Department of the Mediterranean and the city was heavily fortified with the construction of a modern castle in the place of a former Moorish Kasbah, several barracks and a huge arsenal. In a relatively short period of time, the population of the city grew from around 10,000 to 50,000 inhabitants.

In 1757, during the Seven Years' War, a French naval force was forced to take shelter in the port. A squadron under Duquesne sent to reinforce them was attacked and defeated by a British squadron under Henry Osborn at the Battle of Cartagena.

In 1873, the city established a self-governing Canton of Cartagena and become the center of the Cantonal Revolution. Governmental forces besieged the city for several months until they surrendered.

During the Spanish Civil War (1936–1939), Cartagena was the main base of the Spanish Republican Navy and one of the primary strongholds of the Republican Government. It held out against the forces of General Francisco Franco longer than any other city in Spain, being the last of its cities to surrender. The city saw its industrial activity increased during the 1950s, resulting in more prosperity and this trend continued until a general decline in manufacturing throughout Europe in the late 1980s and early 1990s.

Present

At the moment, Cartagena comprises part of the autonomous community of the Region of Murcia, and is the seat of the Regional Assembly of Murcia. It is also capital of the maritime province of Cartagena, which was granted by the Royal Decree of 5 October 1607 under the reign of Philip III.

Demographics
According to the Municipal census, as of January 2011, Cartagena has 218,210 inhabitants, ranking 24th in Spain in terms of population (and 6th among the non-capitals). 182,021 people live in the urban area and 39,840 in the several satellite quarters. According to the official population data, 14.73% of the municipality's population had a foreign nationality.

Its metropolitan area, which includes the municipalities of La Unión, Fuente Álamo de Murcia, Los Alcázares, San Javier, Torre Pacheco, San Pedro del Pinatar and Mazarrón, has a total of 390,983 inhabitants.

Economy 
Economy activities related to energy are among the main ones in the municipality. They are located in Valle de Escombreras. This spot, which is a valley, is located in a district named Escombreras that is placed in the south of the municipality and of 5–10 km from the main locality by its west. Agriculture is another noteworthy activity in the Cartagena and 37.9% of the territory consisted of crop lands in 2017. The most widely grown products are melons, lettuces, potatoes, lemons and almonds. 52.77% of the agreements occurred in this sector and 42.83% of the workers were hired as labourers in 2012. the Shipbuilding has less weight than some centuries ago, but it is still moderately important. This is performed in the port of Cartagena, the main locality of the municipality. Plastic production is also performed, specifically in the northwest of the territory. The tertiary sector has risen during the last decades, specifically tourism and hotel industry. 14,12% of the agreements in the municipality were aimed at waiters in 2012.

Government and administration 
As generally in Spain, the governors of the municipalities are indirectly elected on the day of municipal and regional elections,  every four years. The D'Hondt system is used for allocating the governors from the votes. The body of all the elected councilors is named pleno and has 27 members in Cartagena. The head governor has the name of alcalde (feminine, alcaldesa). Since Cartagena is inhabited by more than 5,000 people, there is also a junta de gobierno local, the members are selected by the alcalde from the pleno. Currently, there are 9 members in the governing cabinet. Four members of the cabinet belong to Partido Popular party, one to Ciudadanos and there are also four nonpartisan politicians, including the alcaldesa, who belonged to PSOE (Partido Socialista Obrero Español) party but were expelled of the party because they had made an agreement with Partido Popular party and Ciudadanos in order to compose the pleno.

There are also committees named juntas vecinales in some localities and districts. Administrative centres are also available for inhabitants who don't live in the main town and the can perform some administrative processes there. They are located in some districts and localities and name is omitas.

Main sights

Thanks to its strategic position on the Mediterranean, Cartagena has been inhabited by many different cultures, which have left their mark on its rich cultural heritage during a glorious and turbulent history.

The "Cartagena, Port of Cultures" initiative was created to allow visitors to enjoy a wide range of activities and visits, discovering the cultural wealth and rich history of the city. It is one of several projects to energize the tourist possibilities of this potential major cultural destination, frequently neglected by the mass-tourism, due to the proximity of several holiday resorts, and the refinery and other industrial development, which gave a bad reputation to the city because of pollution; these last have now fortunately been eradicated.

Archaeological sites

Although there are some ruins from the Carthaginian period, like the remains of the Punic rampart (built in 227 BC with the foundation of the city), most of its oldest monuments date from the time of the Roman Empire when Cartagena flourished.
The archaeologist Blanca Roldán studied this Punic Rampart and other Punic remains, especially on the Molinete Hill. Among its numerous Roman remains, the recently restored Roman theatre of Carthago Nova is prominent and is one of the city's landmarks. Work on it started at the end of the 2nd century BC. The Roman Theatre Museum was recently officially inaugurated. In Roman Republican Times, the mines near Cartagena provided silver and lead for all the Roman Empire.

Other Roman remains can be found in several buildings and interpretative centres, including the Roman Colonnade, the House of Fortune, the decumanus/cardo and the Augusteum.
The Torre Ciega was built by the Romans for burials; it formed part of the Necropolis.

The Roman Amphitheatre (1st century AD) was sited where the now-abandoned Bullring was built, but only some of the surrounding walls and part of the rooms under the stands are still visible. Recent work is revealing more evidence.

Besides the Roman heritage, archaeological sights include the remains of the Santa María la Vieja Cathedral, which was irreversibly destroyed during the Spanish Civil War. It dates from the end of the 13th century. The decorated floor of a Roman house of the 1st century BC can be found in the crypt.

A Byzantine rampart can be found, close to the Roman Theatre and the Cathedral.

The Concepción Castle (now Centre for the Interpretation of the History of Cartagena) was reconstructed in the 13th century using large structures from the Amphitheatre. Apart from the Roman Theatre Museum, there are also two important archaeological museums: the Municipal Archaeological Museum and the recently opened Arqua (National Museum of Maritime Archaeology).

Baroque and Neo-classical buildings

The Campus Muralla del Mar, an old military hospital, was one of the first works carried out after the transformation of the city into the main Spanish naval base in the Mediterranean, and is now the seat of the Polytechnic University. In the vicinity, there is the Autopsy Theatre, which is where anatomy classes used to be given. Rehabilitation for tourism provides for the interpretation of the nearby buildings at the time of their construction.

These buildings and several other baroque or neo-classical buildings demonstrate the military importance of Cartagena. These include the Charles III Rampart, the Castillo de San Julián, the Arsenal, the Midshipmen's Barracks (academy and naval barracks), the Naval Headquarter Palace (built in 1740 and subsequently rebuilt) and the Artillery Headquarters, which also houses the Military Museum.
Among the Baroque or Neo-classical Churches in Cartagena are El Carmen, Santo Domingo and Santa Maria de Gracia.

The austere facade of the Molina House hides the Centre of Arts and Craft.

Modernist and Eclectic buildings

Cartagena is home to numerous Art Nouveau buildings from the early 20th century, when a bourgeoisie settled in the city due to the growth of the local mining industry. These buildings include the City Hall, the Grand Hotel, the Casino (all of them among the city's landmarks).

The Railway Station has some outstanding iron doors and columns on its facade, and inside can still be seen the original ticket office, door frame, ceiling, and lamps. Other modernist or eclectic houses include the Clares House, the Aguirre Palace (which houses the Regional Museum of Modern Art, or MURAM), the Cervantes House (relatively big in comparison with other modernist buildings), the Llagostera House, the Pedreño Palace, the Dorda House, the Zapata House and the Urban Expansion Company House.

Several charming, lively streets cover this area, such as Calle Mayor (High Street), the major pedestrian and commercial street of the city, full of boutiques and bars with typical "tapas", Carmen Street, Puertas de Murcia Street and many more.

The Caridad church is one of the most important churches in the city, since it is dedicated to the patron of Cartagena, Nuestra Señora de Caridad. The interior is dominated by a dome, similar to the Pantheon of Agrippa, in Rome. There are also several outstanding sculptures by the famous Murcian sculptor Francisco Salzillo and his school.

Modern sights

The Civil War Shelter-Museum is based on the galleries excavated out the Concepción hill (site of the Castle) to serve as air-raid shelters during the Spanish Civil War. Many naval and military attractions belong to this era, such as the Naval Museum and the world-famous Peral Submarine invented by Isaac Peral (born in Cartagena) that was launched in 1888 as one of the first submarines ever. It was displayed on Cartagena's harbour promenade until its move to the Naval Museum, after a full restoration.

The Monument to the Heroes of Santiago de Cuba and Cavite (1923) is a war memorial erected in honour of the Spanish sailors who died in combat with the US Navy in waters off Cavite and Santiago off the Philippine and Cuban coasts.

Other attractions include the Lift-Gangway near the former Bullring and the Concepción Hill, the Regional Assembly (the Parliament of the Region of Murcia) whose facade includes architectural influences from the Renaissance while maintaining a modernist air (typical in the Levant), and the Carmen Conde-Antonio Moliner Museum that reconstructs the atmosphere in which these poets from Cartagena created some of their most important works.

Beaches

Although the city itself is only a port, within the city limits lies part of La Manga del Mar Menor (the other part belonging to the municipality of San Javier) which encompasses the Mar Menor. Cartagena also includes part of the Murcian Mediterranean Coast. Cartagena holds the distinction of being the Spanish city with the most beaches (10) certified "Q for Quality" by the ICTE (Instituto para la Calidad Turística Española). These beaches are: Cala Cortina, Islas Menores, Playa Honda beach, Mar de Cristal, Cala del Pino, Cavanna beach, Barco Perdido beach, El Galúa beach, Levante beach and La Gola beach.

El Portús beach is adjacent to the naturist camping site, so nude bathing is practiced on this beach.

Healthcare 
Cartagena is in Healtharea II (Cartagena) in Region of Murcia. In this area there are 17 subareas, and 13 are in the municipality. 2 hospitals are included in the region and both are placed in the municipality. Cartagena is also home to 30 consultorios (primary care health centres with fewer functions than the centros de salud) and 12 centros de salud.

Transport
Cartagena is served by the Autopista AP-7 linking it to towns and cities further up the Mediterranean coast, and Autovía A-30 to Murcia. The Chinchilla–Cartagena railway reached Cartagena railway station in 1863 and the current station opened in 1903. It will be the future terminus of the Madrid–Levante high-speed rail network.  The narrow-gauge Cartagena-Los Nietos Line serves commuters between Cartagena and La Unión and Los Nietos to the east.

Bus facilities are also present in Cartagena by the urban bus service. There are lines to localities of the municipalities and adjacent municipalities such as La Unión and Torre-Pacheco.

Education 
There are 9 early childhood and primary education public centres in the main town and 5 secondary centres. Four concertados (semiprivate) centres are also placed in the territory and they include primary as well as secondary education. 38 primary education centres are located in the other districts as well as 10 secondary education centres. A special education centre can be found in the district El Plan, that is in the east of the western half of Cartagena.

A public university named Universidad Politécnica de Cartagena (UPCT), a centre of the public distance university UNED, a campus of the private university Universidad Católica de Murcia (UCAM) and a private university, which name is ISEN, occur in the municipality. UPCT includes degrees related to engineering and architecture, in UNED there are 28 degrees, in UCAM people can choose among 9 degrees and in ISEN 9 degrees are taught.

There are also three vocational education centres (CIFP) in the municipality, but vocational degrees are taught in some secondary education centres (IES). The main town is home to a centre of a national public organisation about language teaching. English, French, German, Arabic and Italian are taught from A1 level to C2.

They town council has an organisation named Universidad Popular de Cartagena where several courses are taught and courses for access to middle vocational degrees, higher vocational degrees and university degrees are included. A centre for adult education can also be found in the main town where people can study elemental contents, secondary education for adults, the contents of the secondary education examination, the contents of the entry examination for CFGS (higher level vocational education), the contents of the entry examination for university degrees, Spanish, English, and a FPB (basic vocational education) for Computing.

Sports 
Probably, the most remarkable element in regards to sports is Fútbol Club Cartagena (F. C. Cartagena) team, which is in Segunda División, the second level of the Spanish football league system. Another sport team is Futsal Cartagena, which is most in Segunda División during most seasons. A successful team is UCAM Cartagena Tenis de Mesa.

Others sport that are played in the municipality is basketball along with Club Basket Cartagena; handball, which most noteworthy team is C.A.B. Cartagena and badminton along with UPCT Bádminton Cartagena.

An international competition of aesthetic group gymnastics was held along with IFAGG (International Federation of Aesthetic Group Gymnastics) in Cartagena from 17 May to 19.

In regards to sports facilities, the two main ones for the average citizen are two pavilions, which names are Pabellón Central or Wsell de Guimbarda and Piscina Municipal, but there are also pavilions and sports facilities in the districts. A stadium can also be found in the main city area.

Notable people
 Hasdrubal the Fair (c. 270 BC – 221 BC), military leader and general
 Licinianus of Cartagena (554–602), archbishop of the Diocese Cartaginense
 Hazim al-Qartayanni (1184–1211), poet
 Juan Fernández (1528–1599), mariner and explorer of the Pacific Ocean and Polynesia
 Sebastián Raval (1550–1604), composer
 Antonio de Escaño (1750–1814), army and naval officer
 Baltasar Hidalgo de Cisneros (1755–1829), naval officer
 Isidoro Máiquez (1768–1820), actor, painted by Francisco de Goya
 Isaac Peral (1851–1895), engineer, naval officer and designer of the Peral Submarine
 Marcos Jiménez de la Espada (1831–1898), zoologist, geographer, historian, herpetologist, explorer and writer
 Juan Luis Beigbeder y Atienza (1888–1957), military and political leader
 Luis Calandre (1890–1961), physician
 Antonio Oliver (1903–1968), poet, poeta pertaining to the Generación del 27
 Carmen Conde (1907–1996), writer
 Alfonso Pérez Sánchez (1935–2010), art historian and director of the Museo del Prado from 1983 to 1991
 Joaquín Navarro-Valls (b. 1936), doctor, journalist and writer
 Arturo Pérez-Reverte (b. 1951), novelist and journalist, member of the Real Academia Española
 Dolores Soler-Espiauba (b. 1935), novelist
 Federico Trillo (b. 1952), politician affiliated with the Partido Popular, ex-president of the Congreso de los Diputados and Spanish Ministry of Defence and current ambassador of Spain to the United Kingdom
 José Ortega Cano (b. 1953), bullfighter
 José Antonio Sánchez Baíllo (b. 1953), painter and engraver
 Eduardo Zaplana (b. 1956), politician affiliated with the Partido Popular
 Charris (b. 1962), painter
 José Carlos Martínez (b. 1969), dancer and choreographer
Robert Sanchez (b. 1997), professional footballer for Brighton and Hove Albion

Festivals
These are the most known festivals of the municipality:

Cartagena's Holy Week, declared an item of International Tourist Interest. The main activity that is carried out during these festive days are the processions (solemn religious parades). The ones that take place in Cartagena have a special feature that consists in a specially high arrangement of the distribution and movement of the participants.
Carthaginians and Romans, declared an item of National Tourist Interest. The main festivities of the city, a colourful Carthaginian and Roman parade full of events that recall the Punic Wars and the conquest of the city by both Empires. Held over the final ten days of September.
Cruces de Mayo: This festivity consists mainly in setting flowered Christian crosses with revere purposes.

Festivities in the districts 

 Patron saint festivities: Different patron saints are venerated and different festivities are held throughout the municipality. There are activities that are more or less frequent in these festivities such as little processions (festive religious parades) and romerías (religious festive acts that consist in a little procession where a statue of the Virgin or Christ is carried and end in a large festive people meeting at an isolated church).

Twin towns - Sister cities 
Cartagena is twinned with:
 Carthage, Tunisia since 1989
 Cartagena de Indias, Colombia
 Terni, Italy

See also 
Campo de Cartagena
 Navantia Spanish Shipbuilding Industry
 Spanish Navy
 Isaac Peral Cartagena inventor of the electric submarine

References

Bibliography

 Kilgallon, Michael. Enemy of Belief. Fictional ebook featuring Cartagena.

External links

 Official Tourism Site of Murcia, Spain
 Cartagena City Hall 
 Viva Murcia Information and photographs for Cartagena
 Coast batteries of Cenizas and Castillitos
 Photos of Cartagena (click on English at the bottom)
 Handball Club Cartagena, Spain

 
Roman amphitheatres in Spain
Nude beaches
Populated places of the Byzantine Empire
Phoenician colonies in Spain
Populated coastal places in Spain
Phoenician cities
Carthaginian colonies